The Mequon-Thiensville School District (MTSD) is a school district that serves the Milwaukee suburbs of Mequon and Thiensville, Wisconsin. Since 2017, the superintendent is Matthew Joynt.

The district has a ratio of 16 students per teacher.

History
In recent years, the district has faced fiscal problems as enrollment started to decline and a new state formula was implemented in school funding.  After plans for a $7.5 million budget increase were rejected in February 2006, the district hired a local television personality Dennis Krause as a fund-raiser; giving him the title of Community Resource Director.

In 2017 Matthew Joynt became the superintendent.

In 2021 there was a political movement to recall multiple members of the school board.

Demographics
MTSD served 3,563 students in the 2012–2013 school year. The students of the district were 82.7% white, 5.8% black, 5.8% Asian, 3.6% Hispanic, 0.06% Pacific Islander, and 0.02% Native American.

Schools
Homestead High School
Steffen Middle School
Lakeshore Middle School
Donges Bay Grade School
Oriole Lane Grade School
Wilson Grade School

Former schools
Range Line Grade School, closed in 2005
Grand Avenue School, closed in 1982 (converted to condominiums)

References

External links
Mequon-Thiensville School District website
District profile from GreatSchools.net
Profile from the state of Wisconsin
Mequon-Thiensville Education Foundation

Education in Ozaukee County, Wisconsin
School districts in Wisconsin